Höllerersee is a lake of Upper Austria.

Lakes of Upper Austria